Roger Kellaway (born November 1, 1939) is an American composer, arranger and jazz pianist.

Life and career
Kellaway was born in Waban, Massachusetts, United States. He is an alumnus of the New England Conservatory. Kellaway has composed commissioned works for ensembles of various sizes. He also has composed music for film, television, ballet and stage productions. Pianist Phil Saltman was one of his early mentors.

In 1964, Kellaway was a piano sideman for composer/arranger Boris Midney's group The Russian Jazz Quartet's album Happiness on ABC/Impulse jazz records.

Kellaway composed the closing theme "Remembering You" for the television sitcom All in the Family, as well as for the opening[did not compose; performed?] and closing theme for the spinoff Archie Bunker's Place.

In 1970, Kellaway formed the Roger Kellaway Cello Quartet with cellist Edgar Lustgarden. Their piece "Come to the Meadow" was used as the theme for the NPR program Selected Shorts. For their 1978 album, Nostalgia Suite, the group became a quintet with drummer Joe Porcaro.

On November 7 and 8, 2008, Kellaway was bandleader and pianist for the Astral Weeks Live at the Hollywood Bowl concerts by Van Morrison, celebrating the 40th anniversary of Morrison's acclaimed 1968 album.

Kellaway was nominated for an Oscar for Best Adaptation Score for A Star Is Born (1976), and a Grammy Award for Best Instrumental Arrangement for the Eddie Daniels album Memos from Paradise (1988). Guitarist Robben Ford credits Kellaway and Tom Scott, whom he met while playing for Joni Mitchell, as major influences on his music. Kellaway was featured on Ilya Serov's original rendition of Django Reinhardt's song "Swing 42" in 2017.

Discography

As leader

As arranger
With Melanie
 Born to Be (Buddah, 1968)
 Gather Me (Neighborhood/Buddah, 1971)
 Stoneground Words (Neighborhood, 1972)
 Madrugada (Neighborhood, 1973)

With Carmen McRae
 I Am Music (Blue Note, 1975)

With Diane Schuur
 Love Songs (UMG, 1993)

With Liza Minnelli
 Gently (Angel, 1996)

With Robben Ford
 Supernatural (GRP, 1999)

With Gary Lemel
 Moonlighting (Warner, 1999)

As sideman
With Kenny Burrell
Guitar Forms (Verve, 1964–65)
With The Russian Jazz Quartet
Happiness (Impulse!, 1964)
With Stan Getz
Stan Getz Plays Music from the Soundtrack of Mickey One (MGM, 1965)
With J. J. Johnson and Kai Winding
Betwixt & Between (A&M/CTI, 1969)
With George Harrison
Dark Horse (Apple, 1974)
With Jimmy Knepper
Jimmy Knepper in L.A. (Discomate, 1977)
With Herbie Mann
Herbie Mann Plays The Roar of the Greasepaint – The Smell of the Crowd (Atlantic, 1965)
With Mark Murphy
That's How I Love the Blues! (Riverside, 1962)
With Oliver Nelson
More Blues and the Abstract Truth (Impulse!, 1964)
Soulful Brass with Steve Allen (Impulse!, 1968)
Black, Brown and Beautiful (Flying Dutchman, 1969)
With Sonny Rollins
Alfie (Impulse!, 1966)
With Lalo Schifrin
There's a Whole Lalo Schifrin Goin' On (Dot, 1968)
With Bud Shank 
Let It Be (Pacific Jazz, 1970)
With Zoot Sims
Just Friends with Harry Sweets Edison
With Sonny Stitt
Broadway Soul (Colpix, 1965)
With Clark Terry
The Happy Horns of Clark Terry (Impulse!, 1964)
Tonight (Mainstream, 1965)
The Power of Positive Swinging (Mainstream, 1965)
With Ben Webster
See You at the Fair  (Impulse!, 1964)
With Kai Winding
Rainy Day (Verve, 1965)
With Jimmy Witherspoon
Blues for Easy Livers (Prestige, 1965)

References

External links

 Biography page on the Roger Kellaway website
New England Conservatory page on Roger Kellaway
RealAudio format sample of "Remembering You", 25 seconds
Roger Kellaway featured on "Swing 42"

1939 births
Living people
Grammy Award winners
Prestige Records artists
Taurus Records artists
American jazz pianists
American male pianists
American jazz composers
American male jazz composers
Gemini Records artists
20th-century American pianists
21st-century American pianists
20th-century American male musicians
21st-century American male musicians
World's Greatest Jazz Band members